Gino Burrini (12 May 1934 – 20 April 2022) was an Italian alpine skier. He competed in two events at the 1956 Winter Olympics.

References

External links
 

1934 births
2022 deaths
Italian male alpine skiers
Olympic alpine skiers of Italy
Alpine skiers at the 1956 Winter Olympics
Sportspeople from Trentino
20th-century Italian people